Tabitha Jane King ( Spruce, born March 24, 1949) is an American author.

Early life 
Tabitha King is the third eldest daughter of Sarah Jane Spruce (née White; December 7, 1923 – April 14, 2007)  and Raymond George Spruce (December 29, 1923 – May 29, 2014). King attended college at the University of Maine, where she met her husband Stephen King through her work-study job in the Raymond H. Fogler Library.

Career 
As of 2006, King had published eight novels and two works of non-fiction. She published her first novel, Small World, through Signet Books in 1981, and in 2006, Candles Burning was published through Berkley Books.  The paperback rights for Small World were bought by New American Library for $165,000. Candles Burning was written predominantly by Michael McDowell, who died in 1999, and the McDowell family requested that King finish the work.

Social activism 
King has served on several boards and committees in the state of Maine, such as the Bangor Public Library board. She also served on the board of the Maine Public Broadcasting System until 1994. In 1998 she received the inaugural Constance H. Carlson Public Humanities Prize, the Maine Humanities Council's highest award, for her work with literacy for the state of Maine.

She currently serves as vice president of WZON/WZLO/WKIT radio stations as well as in the administration of two family philanthropic foundations.

Reception 
Reception to King's work has ranged from negative to positive. Pearl received positive mentions from the Los Angeles Times and the Bangor Daily News, while the Chicago Tribune panned Survivor. The Arizona Daily Star criticized One on One, calling King "a hack", whereas Entertainment Weekly, Time, and the Rocky Mountain News gave the novel positive reviews. Caretakers received positive praise by The New York Times, while Bookreporter.com wrote that some readers might be disappointed by the changes made to McDowell's Candles Burning.

Awards and recognition 
Honorary Doctorates of Humane Letters, University of Maine in Orono (May 1987)
Dowd Achievement Award (1992)
Constance H. Carlson Public Humanities Prize (1998)

Personal life 
She and Stephen King married on January 2, 1971. They have three children: a daughter Naomi and two sons, Joe Hill and Owen King, who are both writers.

Bibliography

Novels

Nonfiction

Short stories 
 The Blue Chair (1981)
 The Demonstration (1985)
 Road Kill (1986)
 Djinn and Tonic (1998)
 The Woman's Room (2002)
 Archie Smith, Boy Wonder (2011)

Poetry 
 A Gradual Canticle for Augustine (1967)
 Elegy for Ike (1967)
 Note 1 from Herodotus (1968)
 Nonsong (1970)
 The Last Vampire: A Baroque Fugue (1971)

Teleplay 
 "The Passion of Reverend Jimmy" (2004)

Contributions and compilations 
 Murderess Ink: The Better Half of the Mystery, Dilys Winn, ed., Bell, 1979
 Shadows, Volume 4, C. L. Grant, ed., Doubleday, 1981
 Midlife Confidential, ed. David Marsh et al., photographs by Tabitha King, Viking Penguin, 1994

Notes

References

Further reading 
Mcaleer, Patrick. The Writing Family of Stephen King: A Critical Study of the Fiction of Tabitha King, Joe Hill and Owen King. McFarland. 2011.

External links 

 

 Stephen & Tabitha King Foundation
 Joseph Hillstrom King
 Owen Phillip King

1949 births
20th-century American novelists
21st-century American novelists
20th-century American women writers
21st-century American women writers
American women novelists
Living people
People from Old Town, Maine
Stephen King
University of Maine alumni
Writers from Bangor, Maine
Activists from Maine
Novelists from Maine